The Bold is an epithet which may refer to:

People
 Albert III, Duke of Saxony (1443–1500)
 Bolesław II the Generous (c. 1041 or 1042–1081 or 1082), also the Bold and the Cruel, King and Duke of Poland
 Brendan the Navigator (c. 484–c. 577), Irish monastic saint
 Charles the Bold or the Rash (1433-1477), Duke of Burgundy
 Mstislav Mstislavich (died 1228), prince of Kievan Rus
 Philip III of France, le Hardi (the Bold) (1245-1285), King of France
 Philip the Bold (1342-1404), Duke of Burgundy
 Uhtred the Bold (died 1016), ealdorman of Northumbria
 Vladimir the Bold (1353-1410), a prince of Serpukhov (in present-day Russia)

Legendary figures
Vadim the Bold, a chieftain of the Ilmen Slavs

See also
 Bold (disambiguation)

Lists of people by epithet